George Lees Underhil (20 May 1813—24 January 1881) was a successful iron merchant who became thirteenth Mayor of Wolverhampton (1861/62).

Early life
George Lees Underhill was born 20 May 1813 in Wolverhampton, the son of ironmonger Joseph Underhill and Sarah. George and his wife Caroline lived in Dudley Street and had three children, but only their son Joseph survived beyond infancy. Caroline was 29 when she died leaving Underhill a widower with one son, who became a barrister-at-law. Underhill did not remarry.

Politics
Underhill was elected thirteenth Mayor of Wolverhampton from  27 November 1861 to 1862.

Queen's Visit

Following the death of Albert, Prince Consort in 1861, Underhill led a subscription to raise funds to erect a statue in Wolverhampton.  The statue by sculptor, Thomas Thornycroft, was completed in 1866. Underhill, along with three other civic dignitaries, travelled to London to petition the Queen to unveil the statue. This was despite the Queen having turned down invitations to public appearances in Liverpool and Manchester. Surprisingly she agreed and visited Wolverhampton nine days later, on 30 November 1866. The Queen was impressed by her reception and borrowing a sword from the Lord Lieutenant, knighted the then Mayor, John Morris, on the spot.

Personal life
Underhill died in Wolverhampton on 24 January 1881 and was buried on 2 February in Merridale Municipal Cemetery.

References

1813 births
1881 deaths
Mayors of Wolverhampton
People of the Victorian era